Cricut is an American brand of cutting plotters, or computer-controlled cutting machines, designed for home crafters. The machines are used for cutting paper, felt, vinyl, fabric and other materials such as leather, matboard, and wood.

Models
The largest machine will produce letters from a half inch to 23 inches high. Both the Cricut and Cricut Explore Air 2 require mats and blades which can be adjusted to cut through various types of paper, vinyl and other sheet products. The Cricut operates as a paper cutter based upon cutting parameters programmed into the machine, and resembles a desktop printer.

Cartridges
Designs are made from components stored on cartridges. Each cartridge comes with a keyboard overlay and instruction booklet. The plastic keyboard overlay indicates key selections for that cartridge only. However recently Provo Craft has released a "Universal Overlay" that is compatible with all cartridges released after August 1, 2013. The purpose of the universal overlay is to simplify the process of cutting by only having to learn one keyboard overlay instead of having to learn the overlay for each individual cartridge. Designs can be cut out on a PC with the Cricut Design Studio software, on a USB connected Gypsy machine, or can be directly inputted on the Cricut machine using the keyboard overlay. There are two types of cartridges, shape and font. Each cartridge provides for hundreds of different cuts. Currently over 275 cartridges are available, with new ones regularly released. While some cartridges are generic in content, Cricut has licensing agreements with Disney, Pixar, Nickelodeon, Sesame Street, DC Comics and Hello Kitty. The cartridges are interchangeable, although not all options on a cartridge may be available with the smaller machines.

Software

Proprietary
To use Cricut cutters, users must use the company's own web-based design software, Design Space, which allows users to draw designs, select and combine designs from its own online library, or upload vector or bitmap files they haveve created in other software.

On 12 March 2021, Cricut announced it would be limiting users to 20 free uploads per month to Design Space at an unspecified date; the old unlimited uploads would remain available under a paid subscription. This announcement was criticized by users at the company's unofficial subreddit, and a petition was launched in protest. Following the backlash, its CEO apologized, and Cricut scrapped the plans a few days later.

Past software
Cricut's first software was Cricut design studio. Released November 15, 2005, it allowed users to combine images from different cartridges, merge images, and stretch/rotate images; it does not allow for the creation of arbitrary designs. Support was dropped sometime in 2013.

The Cricut Craft Room software enabled users to combine images from different cartridges, merge images, and stretch/rotate images; it does not allow for the creation of arbitrary designs. It also enables the user to view the images displayed on-screen before beginning the cutting process, so the end result can be seen in advance.

Citing Adobe's abandonment of Flash, Cricut announced it would be closing Cricut Craft Room on 15 July 2018. Users of "legacy" machines were offered a discount to update to models compatible with Design Space. As of 16 July 2018, Design Space is the only official software available to compose projects. Some third party programs are available and can be used to input the files into Design Space.

Third-party
Provo Craft has been actively hostile to the use of third-party software programs that could enable Cricut owners to cut out designs and to use the machine without depending on its proprietary cartridges.  In a comparative review of die-cutting machines, review site TopTenReviews identified being "limited to cutting designs from a collection of cartridges" as a major drawback of the Cricut range, though the review noted that it could be a preference for some.

Two programs which could formerly be used to make and then get Cricut machines to cut out arbitrary designs (using, for example, arbitrary TrueType fonts or SVG format graphics) were Make-the-Cut (MTC) and Craft Edge's Sure Cuts A Lot (SCAL). In April 2010 Provo Craft opened legal action against the publishers of Make-the-Cut, and in January 2011 it sued Craft Edge to stop the distribution of the SCAL program.  In both cases the publishers settled with Provo Craft, and removed support for Cricut from their products. The programs continue to be usable with other home cutters.

According to the text of its legal complaint against Craft Edge, "Provo Craft uses various techniques to encrypt and obscure the USB communications between Cricut DesignStudio [a design program supplied with the hardware] and the Cricut e-cutter, in order to protect Provo Craft's proprietary software and firmware, and to prevent attempts to intercept the cutting commands". Provo Craft contended that in order to understand and replicate this obscured protocol, Craft Edge had disassembled the DesignStudio program, contrary to the terms of its End User License Agreement, thereby (the company asserted) breaching copyright law.  Provo Craft also asserted that Craft Edge were violating its trademark in the word "Cricut" by saying that its software could work with Cricut machines.  Provo Craft asserted that this was likely "to cause confusion, mistake or deception as to the source or origin of Defendant's goods or services, and [was] likely to falsely suggest a sponsorship, connection, license, or association of Defendant's goods and services with Provo Craft".

References

Further reading
 "Gadgets to Help Make Homemade Crafts." CBS News.
 "Even Martha Stewart loves Provo Craft's latest: Cricut Cake." Deseret News.

External links
 

Handicrafts
Food and drink decorations
Paper art
Companies listed on the Nasdaq
2021 initial public offerings
South Jordan, Utah
Companies based in Salt Lake County, Utah